Sulphide (the British English spelling of "sulfide") is a chemical term associated with the following chemical classes: 

 Sulfide
 Bisulfide
 Disulfide
 Thioether

It can also be associated with the name of a geographic location:

Places
 Sulphide Creek Falls, a waterfall in North Cascades National Park
 Sulphide Glacier, a glacier feeding the falls
 Sulphide Creek, the creek feeding the falls
 Sulphide Lake, a small lake upstream of the falls
 Sulphide, Ontario
 Sulphide Creek (Hastings County)